In Ovid's Metamorphoses, Phantasos ('Fantasy') is one of the thousand sons of Somnus (Sleep). He appeared in dreams in the form of inanimate objects, putting on "deceptive shapes of earth, rocks, water, trees, all lifeless things".

According to Ovid, two of his brothers were Morpheus, who appeared in dreams in human form, and one called Icelos ('Like'), by the gods, but Phobetor ('Frightener') by men, who appeared in dreams in the form of beasts. The three brothers' names are found nowhere earlier than Ovid, and are perhaps Ovidian inventions. Tripp calls these three figures "literary, not mythical concepts". However Griffin suggests that this division of dream forms between Phantasos and his brothers, possibly including their names, may have been of Hellenistic origin.

Notes

References
 .
 Ovid. Metamorphoses, Volume II: Books 9-15. Translated by Frank Justus Miller. Revised by G. P. Goold. Loeb Classical Library No. 43. Cambridge, Massachusetts: Harvard University Press, 1916. Online version at Harvard University Press.
 Tripp, Edward, Crowell's Handbook of Classical Mythology, Thomas Y. Crowell Co; First edition (June 1970). .

Fictional characters with dream manipulation abilities
Greek sleep deities